Klaudia Zwolińska (born 18 December 1998) is a Polish slalom canoeist who has competed at the international level since 2013.

Zwolińska won a bronze medal in the K1 team event at the 2022 ICF Canoe Slalom World Championships in Augsburg. She also won two medals (1 silver and 1 bronze) in the K1 team event at the European Championships. Zwolińska also won the K1 event at the 2015 and 2016 Junior European Championships and the 2016 Junior World Championships.

She became the first ever polish woman to win a Canoe Slalom World Cup, winning the opening round of the 2021 season.

Zwolińska competed at the 2014 Youth Olympic Games in the Head-to-Head Sprint and Obstacle Slalom events, where she finished 17th and 7th, respectively. She represented Poland in the K1 Event at the 2020 Summer Olympics in Tokyo. Klaudia qualified 10th fastest for the final and finished in 5th place after incurring two 2-second penalties.

World Cup individual podiums

References

External links 

 

1998 births
Living people
Polish female canoeists
People from Nowy Sącz
Canoeists at the 2020 Summer Olympics
Olympic canoeists of Poland
20th-century Polish women
21st-century Polish women
Medalists at the ICF Canoe Slalom World Championships